The siege of Tralee was an event that took place between 1 and 9 November 1920 in Tralee, County Kerry, Ireland.

History
Patrick Cahill, the Officer Commanding Kerry No. 1 Brigade, Irish Republican Army instructed the Tralee Battalion to carry out reprisal attacks for the death (on hunger strike) of Sinn Féin Lord Mayor of Cork Terence MacSwiney. On the night of 31 October 1920, RIC Constable Patrick Waters and RIC Constable Ernest Bright had been kidnapped, shot and killed by IRA volunteers in Tralee. In response to the seizure of two of their colleagues and in an attempt to recover the bodies, British temporary constables (Black and Tans) imposed a curfew on the town, shot local people who appeared on the streets, insisted that the local businesses close and stopped all food and drink from entering the town. Tralee Town Hall and several shops were burned down and two civilians were shot dead (John Conway and Tommy Wall).

Hamar Greenwood, the Chief Secretary for Ireland, ordered that the siege be lifted on 9 November 1920.

References

Military actions and engagements during the Irish War of Independence